Lubień is a village in Myślenice County, Lesser Poland Voivodeship, in southern Poland. It is the seat of the gmina (administrative district) called Gmina Lubień.

The village has a population of 3,200.

References

Villages in Myślenice County